Cemal Madanoğlu (22 March 1907 – 28 July 1993) was a Turkish soldier and general. He attained the rank of lieutenant general.

Born in Izmir on 22 March 1907, he attended the Military Academy, the Academy of High Command – Muğla 1, Mountain Regiment Command, Nigde 12th Infantry Regiment, Cizre 7. Border Battalion, Urfa Provincial Gendarmerie Command Annexed, Siirt Mobile 10 Gendarmerie Battalion Officer Siirt 1 Infantry Regiment Company Commander, Istanbul 189 Infantry Regiment Officer, Pergamum 205 Mountain Brigade Regiment Commander, General Staff Officer 1 Branch, Istanbul Terkos 24 Division 1. Branch Manager, Branch Manager of Istanbul Martial Law Command 1, Talim University Regiment Battalion Commander, 82 Infantry Regiment Battalion Kilyos Commander, 1 Maltepe Armored Division Chief of Istanbul Air Defense Chief of Staff of Regional Command, Izmit 3 6th Corps. Branch Manager, Erzincan 3. Domestic Regional Miliraty Command, Balkanlıg Land Forces Operations Branch Manager, Alemdağ 32 Regiment Commander, Korea, Turkey Brigade Deputy Commander, Siirt, 12 Division Commander, while it was being established, Second Army Chief of Konya, Ankara Armored Training Elazig Division and 10th Mountain Division Commander, Land Forces Logistics President, Commander of Martial Law in Ankara, National Unity Committee Member (05.27.1960 – Resignation: 07.20.1961).

Cemal Madanoğlu was among the leaders of the 1960 Turkish coup d'état. he was asked to lead the coup by his subordinates due to fact he was the only General that was willing take lead he said: "Making a revolution requires balls, I have that." 
During the coup he was asked by Army general Ragıp Gümüşpala on telephone that is he the most senior among the putschists, Ragıp Gümüşpala said he would put down the putsch if there is no one that outranks himself. Madanoğlu bluffed that General Cemal Gürsel was their leader and he was on a flight to Ankara from İzmir 
Before the coup he made every subordinate to swore an oath not to take part in ministrial office. but during a meeting with Cemal Gürsel he noticed same subordinates were trying to put together a government that included themselves according to Madanoğlu he slapped the table and said: You jackals! Which of you understands finance, which of you understands trade, which of you understands economy, we are in this position because Menderes did the same.

after the coup he released Democrat Party deputies and he brought together Academicians from Istanbul University to provide the Junta with a roadmap back in to democracy but was advised by Professor Sıddık Sami Onar that they should not give power back to the parliament instead they should put Adnan Menderes and deputies of Democrat Party on trial and enact structural reforms. Former President İsmet İnönü told him even if they are guilty there should be no execution. people would forget their crimes but would remember that they were hanged. after a series of infighting in the military he resigned.

In retirement Lieutenant general Madanoğlu was involved in a coup plot that would complete what 1960 Turkish coup d'état could not finished in means of reforms. This plan foiled when National Intelligence Organization bugged his meetings. General Faruk Gürler feared that his fellow plotters were more left-leaning than he assumed. This coup plot caused 1971 Turkish military memorandum. Madanoğlu was a prominent figure in left-wing politics.

Madanoğlu gave series of interviews regarding his part in Turkish military coup, 1960 to 32. Gün. He died on 28 July 1993 in Istanbul. He is buried in Karacaahmet Cemetery.

References

Turkish generals
1907 births
1993 deaths